Love City may refer to:

 "Love City (Postcards from Duluth)", a song by Noel Paul Stookey from Peter, Paul and Mary's album: Late Again
 "Ai City", a Japanese science fiction manga created by Shuuhou Itahashi
 Love city, a 1986 animated film based on the manga
 Love City, a pervasive game
 Love City, an EP from pop duo D,Kr

See also
The City of Love, a 2007 novel by Rimi B. Chatterjee
City of Love (album), a 2020 album by Deacon Blue
The City of Brotherly Love, a nickname for Philadelphia